

Events

Pre-1600
1066 – William the Conqueror and his army set sail from the mouth of the Somme river, beginning the Norman conquest of England.
1331 – The Battle of Płowce is fought, between the Kingdom of Poland and the Teutonic Order. The Poles are defeated but their leaders escape capture.
1422 – After the brief Gollub War, the Teutonic Knights sign the Treaty of Melno with Poland and Lithuania.
1529 – The Siege of Vienna begins when Suleiman I attacks the city.
1540 – The Society of Jesus (Jesuits) receives its charter from Pope Paul III.
1590 – The death of Pope Urban VII, 13 days after being chosen as the Pope, ends the shortest papal reign in history.

1601–1900
1605 – The armies of Sweden are defeated by the Polish–Lithuanian Commonwealth in the Battle of Kircholm.
1669 – The Venetians surrender the fortress of Candia to the Ottomans, thus ending the 21-year-long Siege of Candia.
1777 – American Revolution: Lancaster, Pennsylvania becomes the capital of the United States for one day after Congress evacuates Philadelphia.
1791 – The National Assembly of France votes to award full citizenship to Jews.
1821 – The Army of the Three Guarantees triumphantly enters Mexico City, led by Agustín de Iturbide. The following day Mexico is declared independent.
1822 – Jean-François Champollion officially informs the Académie des Inscriptions et Belles Lettres in France that he has deciphered the Rosetta Stone. 
1825 – The world's first public railway to use steam locomotives, the Stockton and Darlington Railway, is ceremonially opened.
1854 – The paddle steamer , owned by the Collins Line of New York, sinks off the coast of Newfoundland, following a collision with a smaller vessel, the SS Vesta. Only 88 of over 300 people on board survive. About a dozen of the occupants of the Vesta are killed when their lifeboat is hit by the Arctic.
1875 – The merchant sailing ship Ellen Southard is wrecked in a storm at Liverpool.

1901–present
1903 – "Wreck of the Old 97": an American rail disaster, in which 11 people are killed; it later becomes the subject of a popular ballad.
1908 – Production of the Model T automobile begins at the Ford Piquette Avenue Plant in Detroit. 
1916 – Iyasu V is proclaimed deposed as ruler of Ethiopia in a palace coup in favor of his aunt Zewditu.
1922 – King Constantine I of Greece abdicates his throne in favor of his eldest son, George II.
1928 – The Republic of China is recognized by the United States.
1930 – Bobby Jones wins the (pre-Masters) Grand Slam of golf.
1938 – The ocean liner Queen Elizabeth is launched in Glasgow.
1940 – World War II: The Tripartite Pact is signed in Berlin by Germany, Japan and Italy.
1941 – The Greek National Liberation Front is established with Georgios Siantos as acting leader.
1941 – The  is launched, becoming the first of more than 2,700 Liberty ships.
1942 – Last day of the Matanikau action on Guadalcanal as United States Marines barely escape after being surrounded by Japanese forces.
1944 – The Kassel Mission results in the largest loss by a USAAF group on any mission in World War II.
1949 – Zeng Liansong's design is chosen as the flag of the People's Republic of China.
1956 – USAF Captain Milburn G. Apt becomes the first person to exceed Mach 3. Shortly thereafter, the Bell X-2 goes out of control and Captain Apt is killed.
1959 – Typhoon Vera kills nearly 5,000 people in Japan.
1962 – The Yemen Arab Republic is established.
  1962   – Rachel Carson's book Silent Spring is published, inspiring an environmental movement and the creation of the U.S. Environmental Protection Agency.
1964 – The British TSR-2 aircraft XR219 makes its maiden flight.
1975 – The last use of capital punishment in Spain sparks worldwide protests.
1977 – Japan Airlines Flight 715 crashes on approach to Sultan Abdul Aziz Shah Airport in Subang, Malaysia, killing 34 of the 79 people on board.
1988 – The National League for Democracy is formed by Aung San Suu Kyi and others to fight dictatorship in Myanmar.
1993 – The Sukhumi massacre takes place in Abkhazia.
1996 – The Battle of Kabul ends in a Taliban victory; an Islamic Emirate of Afghanistan is established.
  1996   – Confusion on a tanker ship results in the Julie N. oil spill in Portland, Maine.
1998 – The Google internet search engine retroactively claims this date as its birthday.
2001 – In Switzerland, a gunman shoots 18 citizens, killing 14 and then himself.
2003 – The SMART-1 satellite is launched.
2007 – NASA launches the Dawn probe to the asteroid belt.
2008 – CNSA astronaut Zhai Zhigang becomes the first Chinese person to perform a spacewalk.
2012 – In Minneapolis, a gunman shoots seven citizens, killing five and then himself.
2014 – The eruption of Mount Ontake in Japan occurs.
2019 – Over two million people participated in worldwide strikes to protest climate change across 2,400 locations worldwide.
2020 – Second Nagorno-Karabakh war: Azerbaijan launched an offensive against the self-proclaimed Republic of Artsakh, inhabited predominantly by ethnic Armenians.

Births

Pre-1600
808 – Ninmyō, Japanese emperor (d. 850)
 830 – Ermentrude of Orléans, Queen of the Franks (probable year; d. 869)
1271 – Wenceslaus II of Bohemia, King of Bohemia and Poland (d. 1305)
1275 – John II, Duke of Brabant (d. 1312)
1300 – Adolf, Count Palatine of the Rhine (d. 1327)
1389 – Cosimo de' Medici, ruler of Florence (d. 1464)
1433 – Stanisław Kazimierczyk, Polish canon regular and saint (d. 1489)
1442 – John de la Pole, 2nd Duke of Suffolk (d. 1491)
1496 – Hieronymus Łaski, Polish diplomat (d. 1542)
1507 – Guillaume Rondelet, French physician (d. 1566)
1533 – Stefan Batory, King of Poland (d. 1586)
1544 – Takenaka Shigeharu, Japanese samurai (d. 1579)
1552 – Flaminio Scala, Italian playwright and stage actor (d. 1624)
1598 – Robert Blake, English admiral (d. 1657)

1601–1900
1601 – Louis XIII of France (d. 1643)
1627 – Jacques-Bénigne Bossuet, French bishop and theologian (d. 1704)
1643 – Solomon Stoddard, American pastor and librarian (d. 1729)
1657 – Sofia Alekseyevna of Russia (d. 1704)
1677 – Giovanni Carlo Maria Clari, Italian violinist and composer (d. 1754)
1696 – Alphonsus Maria de' Liguori, Italian bishop and saint (d. 1787)
1719 – Abraham Gotthelf Kästner, German mathematician and epigrammatist (d. 1800)
1722 – Samuel Adams, American philosopher and politician, fourth Governor of Massachusetts (d. 1803)
1729 – Michael Denis, Austrian lepidopterist, author, and poet (d. 1800)
1739 – Francis Russell, Marquess of Tavistock, Irish politician (d. 1767)
1765 – Antoine Philippe de La Trémoille, French general (d. 1794)
1772 – Martha Jefferson Randolph, daughter of Thomas Jefferson who had twelve children (d. 1836)
1783 – Agustín de Iturbide, Mexican royalist turned insurgent; first emperor of Mexico (d. 1824)
1803 – Samuel Francis Du Pont, American admiral (d. 1865)
1805 – George Müller, German-English evangelist and missionary, founded the Ashley Down Orphanage (d. 1898)
1818 – Hermann Kolbe, German chemist and academic (d. 1884)
1821 – Henri-Frédéric Amiel, Swiss philosopher, poet, and critic (d. 1881)
1824 – William "Bull" Nelson, American general (d. 1862)
1830 – William Babcock Hazen, American general (d. 1887)
1838 – Lawrence Sullivan Ross, American general and politician, 19th Governor of Texas (d. 1898)
1840 – Alfred Thayer Mahan, American captain and historian (d. 1914)
  1840   – Thomas Nast, German-American cartoonist (d. 1902)
1842 – Alphonse François Renard, Belgian geologist and petrographer (d. 1903)
1843 – Gaston Tarry, French mathematician and academic (d. 1913)
1861 – Corinne Roosevelt Robinson, American poet and author (d. 1933)
1864 – Andrej Hlinka, Slovak priest and politician (d. 1938)
1866 – Eurosia Fabris, Italian saint (d. 1932)
1871 – Grazia Deledda, Italian novelist and poet, Nobel Prize laureate (d. 1936)
1873 – Vithalbhai Patel,  Indian legislator and political leader (d. 1933)
1879 – Hans Hahn, Austrian mathematician and philosopher (d. 1934)
  1879   – Frederick Schule, American hurdler and coach (d. 1962)
  1879   – Cyril Scott, English poet and composer (d. 1970)
1882 – Dorothy Greenhough-Smith, English figure skater and tennis player (d. 1965)
1885 – Harry Blackstone, Sr., American magician (d. 1965)
  1885   – Charles Benjamin Howard, Canadian businessman and politician (d. 1964)
1892 – George Bambridge, English diplomat (d. 1943)
1894 – Lothar von Richthofen, German lieutenant and pilot (d. 1922)
1896 – Gilbert Ashton, English cricketer (d. 1981)
  1896   – Sam Ervin, American soldier and politician (d. 1985)
1898 – Vincent Youmans, American composer and producer (d. 1946)

1901–present
1904 – Edvard Kocbek, Slovenian poet and politician (d. 1981)
1905 – Conrad Heidkamp, German footballer and manager (d. 1994)
1906 – William Empson, English poet and critic (d. 1984)
  1906   – Jim Thompson, American author and screenwriter (d. 1977)
  1906   – Sergei Varshavsky, Russian art collector and author (d. 1980)
1907 – Bernard Miles, English actor, director, producer, and screenwriter (d. 1991)
  1907   – Bhagat Singh, Indian socialist revolutionary (disputed with 28 September) (d. 1931)
1911 – Marcey Jacobson, American-Mexican photographer (d. 2009)
1913 – Albert Ellis, American psychologist and author (d. 2007)
1916 – S. Yizhar, Israeli academic and politician (d. 2006)
1917 – Louis Auchincloss, American novelist and essayist (d. 2010)
  1917   – Carl Ballantine, American magician and actor (d. 2009)
  1917   – William T. Orr, American actor and producer (d. 2002)
  1917   – Benjamin Rubin, American microbiologist (d. 2010)
1918 – Martin Ryle, English astronomer and author, Nobel Prize laureate (d. 1984)
  1918   – Malcolm Shepherd, 2nd Baron Shepherd (d. 2001)
  1918   – Konstantin Gerchik, Soviet military leader (d. 2001)
1919 – Jayne Meadows, American actress and author (d. 2015)
  1919   – Charles H. Percy, American lieutenant and politician (d. 2011)
  1919   – James H. Wilkinson, American mathematician and computer scientist (d. 1986)
1921 – Miklós Jancsó, Hungarian director and screenwriter (d. 2014)
  1921   – Milton Subotsky, American screenwriter and producer, co-founded Amicus Productions (d. 1991)
  1921   – Bernard Waber, American author and illustrator (d. 2013)
1922 – Sammy Benskin, American pianist and bandleader (d. 1992)
  1922   – Arthur Penn, American director and producer (d. 2010)
1924 – Ernest Becker, American-Canadian anthropologist, author, and academic (d. 1974)
  1924   – Bud Powell, American pianist and composer (d. 1966)
  1924   – Fred Singer, Austrian-American physicist and academic (d. 2020)
  1924   – Josef Škvorecký, Czech-Canadian author and publisher (d. 2012)
1925 – Robert Edwards, English physiologist and academic, Nobel Prize laureate (d. 2013)
  1925   – George Gladir, American author (d. 2013)
1926 – Steve Stavro, Canadian businessman and philanthropist (d. 2006)
1927 – Chrysostomos I of Cyprus (d. 2007)
  1927   – Red Rodney, American trumpet player (d. 1994)
  1927   – Romano Scarpa, Italian author and illustrator (d. 2005)
  1927   – Sada Thompson, American actress (d. 2011)
1928 – Margaret Rule, English archaeologist and historian (d. 2015)
1929 – Calvin Jones, American pianist, composer, and educator (d. 2004)
  1929   – Bruno Junk, Estonian race walker (d. 1995)
  1929   – Barbara Murray, English actress (d. 2014)
1930 – Paul Reichmann, Austrian-Canadian businessman, founded Olympia and York (d. 2013)
1931 – Freddy Quinn, Austrian singer, guitarist, and actor
1932 – Geoff Bent, English footballer (d. 1958)
  1932   – Michael Colvin, English captain and politician (d. 2000)
  1932   – Gabriel Loubier, Canadian politician
  1932   – Oliver E. Williamson, American economist and academic, Nobel Prize laureate (d. 2020)
  1932   – Marcia Neugebauer, American geophysicist
1933 – Rodney Cotterill, Danish-English physicist and neuroscientist (d. 2007)
  1933   – Greg Morris, American actor (d. 1996)
1934 – Wilford Brimley, American actor (d. 2020)
  1934   – Claude Jarman, Jr., American actor and producer
  1934   – Dick Schaap, American sportscaster and author (d. 2001)
1935 – Al MacNeil, Canadian ice hockey player and coach
1936 – Don Cornelius, American television host and producer (d. 2012)
  1936   – Gordon Honeycombe, English actor, playwright, and author (d. 2015)
1937 – Vasyl Durdynets, Ukrainian politician and diplomat, eighth Prime Minister of Ukraine 
1938 – Jean-Loup Dabadie, French journalist, songwriter, and screenwriter (d. 2020)
1939 – Nicholas Haslam, English interior designer and author
  1939   – Carol Lynn Pearson, American author, poet, and playwright
  1939   – Kathy Whitworth, American golfer
1940 – Josephine Barstow, English soprano and actress
  1940   – Benoni Beheyt, Belgian cyclist
1941 – Peter Bonetti, English footballer and coach (d. 2020)
  1941   – Serge Ménard, Canadian lawyer and politician
  1941   – Don Nix, American saxophonist, songwriter, and producer 
1942 – Dith Pran, Cambodian photographer and journalist (d. 2008)
  1942   – Alvin Stardust, English singer and actor (d. 2014)
1943 – Prince Amedeo, Duke of Aosta (d. 2021)
  1943   – Randy Bachman, Canadian singer-songwriter and guitarist
1944 – Angélica María, American-born Mexican singer-songwriter and actress
  1944   – Gary Sutherland, American baseball player and scout
1945 – Jack Goldstein, Canadian-American painter (d. 2003)
1946 – Nicos Anastasiades, Cypriot lawyer and politician, seventh President of Cyprus
  1946   – T. C. Cannon, American painter and sculptor (d. 1978)
1947 – Dick Advocaat, Dutch football manager and former player 
  1947   – Richard Court, Australian politician, 26th Premier of Western Australia
  1947   – Barbara Dickson, Scottish singer-songwriter and actress
  1947   – Denis Lawson, Scottish actor, director, and screenwriter
  1947   – Meat Loaf, American singer-songwriter, producer, and actor (d. 2022)
1948 – Tom Braidwood, Canadian actor, director, and producer
  1948   – Les Chapman, English footballer and manager
  1948   – Duncan Fletcher, Rhodesian-Zimbabwean cricketer and coach
1949 – Graham Richardson, Australian journalist and politician, 39th Australian Minister for Health
  1949   – Mike Schmidt, American baseball player
  1949   – Jahn Teigen, Norwegian singer-songwriter and guitarist (d. 2020)
1950 – Cary-Hiroyuki Tagawa, Japanese-American actor and martial artist
1951 – Geoff Gallop, Australian politician, 27th Premier of Western Australia
  1951   – Michel Rivard, Canadian singer-songwriter and guitarist 
  1951   – Jim Shooter, American author and illustrator 
1952 – Katie Fforde, English author
  1952   – Dumitru Prunariu, Romanian pilot, engineer and cosmonaut
1953 – Diane Abbott, English journalist and politician, Shadow Secretary of State for International Development
  1953   – Mata Amritanandamayi, Indian guru and saint
  1953   – Claudio Gentile, Italian footballer and manager
  1953   – Greg Ham, Australian keyboard player, saxophonist and songwriter (d. 2012)
1954 – Ray Hadley, Australian radio host and sportscaster
  1954   – Dmitry Sitkovetsky, Russian violinist and conductor
  1954   – Larry Wall, American computer programmer and author
1956 – Steve Archibald, Scottish footballer and manager
1957 – Bill Athey, English cricketer, footballer, and coach
1958 – Shaun Cassidy, American actor, singer, producer, and screenwriter
  1958   – Irvine Welsh, Scottish author and playwright
1959 – Beth Heiden, American speed skater and cyclist
1960 – Jean-Marc Barr, German-American actor, director, producer, and screenwriter
1962 – Gavin Larsen, New Zealand cricketer and sportscaster
1963 – Marc Maron, American comedian, actor, and radio host
1964 – Predrag Brzaković, Serbian footballer (d. 2012)
  1964   – Tracy Camp, American computer scientist and academic
  1964   – Johnny du Plooy, South African boxer (d. 2013)
  1964   – Stephan Jenkins, American singer-songwriter, guitarist, and producer 
1965 – Steve Kerr, American basketball player, coach and sportscaster
  1965   – Bernard Lord, Canadian lawyer and politician, 30th Premier of New Brunswick
  1965   – Peter MacKay, Canadian lawyer and politician, 50th Canadian Minister of Justice
  1965   – Alexis Stewart, American radio and television host
1966 – Debbie Wasserman Schultz, American politician
  1966   – Stephanie Wilson, American engineer and astronaut
  1966   – Lorenzo Cherubini, Italian singer-songwriter and rapper
1967 – Uche Okechukwu, Nigerian footballer
1968 – Mari Kiviniemi, Finnish politician, 41st Prime Minister of Finland
1970 – Yoshiharu Habu, Japanese chess player and author
  1970   – Tamara Taylor, Canadian actress
1971 – Horacio Sandoval, Mexican illustrator 
1972 – Sylvia Crawley, American basketball player and coach
  1972   – Clara Hughes, Canadian cyclist and speed skater
  1972   – Gwyneth Paltrow, American actress, blogger, and businesswoman
  1972   – Craig L. Rice, American politician
1973 – Vratislav Lokvenc, Czech footballer
  1973   – Stanislav Pozdnyakov, Russian fencer
1974 – Carrie Brownstein, American singer-songwriter, guitarist, and actress 
1976 – Matt Harding, American video game designer and dancer
  1976   – Jason Phillips, American baseball player and coach
  1976   – Francesco Totti, Italian footballer
1977 – Andrus Värnik, Estonian javelin thrower
1978 – Brad Arnold, American rock singer-songwriter
  1978   – Jon Rauch, American baseball player
  1978   – Mihaela Ursuleasa, Romanian pianist (d. 2012)
1979 – Jon Garland, American baseball player
  1979   – Zita Görög, Hungarian actress and model
  1979   – Christian Jones, Australian race car driver
  1979   – Steve Simpson, Australian rugby league player
1980 – Asashōryū Akinori, Mongolian sumo wrestler, the 68th Yokozuna
  1980   – Ehron VonAllen, American singer-songwriter and producer
1981 – Sophie Crumb, American author and illustrator
  1981   – Brendon McCullum, New Zealand cricketer
  1981   – Lakshmipathy Balaji, Indian cricketer
1982 – Jon McLaughlin, American singer-songwriter, guitarist, and producer
  1982   – Markus Rosenberg, Swedish footballer
  1982   – Lil Wayne, American rapper, producer, and actor 
  1982   – Darrent Williams, American football player (d. 2007)
1983 – Jeon Hye-bin, South Korean actress and singer 
1984 – Paul Bevan, Australian footballer
  1984   – Davide Capello, Italian footballer
  1984   – John Lannan, American baseball player
  1984   – Avril Lavigne, Canadian singer-songwriter, actress, and fashion designer
  1984   – Wouter Weylandt, Belgian cyclist (d. 2011)
1985 – Massimo Bertocchi, Canadian decathlete
  1985   – Daniel Pudil, Czech footballer
  1985   – Ibrahim Touré, Ivorian footballer (d. 2014)
1986 – Vin Mazzaro, American baseball player
  1986   – Matt Shoemaker American baseball player
  1986   – Ricardo Risatti, Argentinian race car driver
1987 – Ádám Bogdán, Hungarian footballer
  1987   – Austin Carlile, American singer-songwriter 
  1987   –  Vanessa James, French figure skater
  1987   – Olga Puchkova, Russian tennis player
1988 – Lisa Ryzih, German pole vaulter
1989 – Park Tae-hwan, South Korean swimmer
1991 – Ousmane Barry, Guinean footballer
  1991   – Simona Halep, Romanian tennis player
  1991   – Anete Paulus, Estonian footballer
  1991   – Rio Uchida, Japanese model and actress
1992 – Lachlan Burr, Australian rugby league player
  1992   – Luc Castaignos, Dutch footballer
  1992   – Pak Kwang-ryong, North Korean footballer
  1992   – Ryan O'Shaughnessy, Irish singer-songwriter and actor
  1992   – Gabriel Vasconcelos Ferreira, Brazilian footballer
  1992   – Granit Xhaka, Swiss footballer
1993 – Lisandro Magallán, Argentinian footballer
  1993   – Monica Puig, Puerto Rican-American tennis player
  1993   – Vinnie Sunseri, American football player
1994 – Dylan Walker, Australian rugby league player
1995 – Kwon Eun-bi, South Korean singer and musical actress
1998 – Ioana Mincă, Romanian tennis player
2001 – David Malukas, American race car driver
2002 – Jenna Ortega, American actress

Deaths

Pre-1600
 765 – Pugu Huai'en, Chinese general during the Tang Dynasty
 936 – Gyeon Hwon, king of Hubaekje (b. 867)
1111 – Vekenega, Croatian Benedictine abbess
1115 –  Bonfilius, Italian saint and bishop of Foligno (b.c. 1040)
1125 – Richeza of Berg, Duchess of Bohemia (b.c. 1095)
1194 – Renaud de Courtenay, Anglo-Norman nobleman (b. 1125)
1249 – Raymond VII, Count of Toulouse (b. 1197)
1404 – William of Wykeham, English bishop (b. 1320)
1536 – Felice della Rovere, illegitimate daughter of Pope Julius II (b. 1483)
1612 – Piotr Skarga, Polish Jesuit and polemicist (b. 1536)
1637 – Lorenzo Ruiz, Filipino saint (b. c.1600)
1657 – Olimpia Maidalchini, Roman noble (b. 1591)
1557 – Emperor Go-Nara of Japan (b. 1497)
1590 – Pope Urban VII (b. 1521)

1601–1900
1623 – John VII, Count of Nassau-Siegen (b. 1561)
1651 – Maximilian I, Elector of Bavaria (b. 1573)
1660 – Vincent de Paul, French priest and saint (b. 1581)
1674 – Robert Arnauld d'Andilly, French writer (b. 1589)
1700 – Pope Innocent XII (b. 1615)
1719 – George Smalridge, English bishop (b. 1662)
1730 – Laurence Eusden, English poet and author (b. 1688)
1735 – Peter Artedi, Swedish ichthyologist and zoologist (b. 1705)
1742 – Hugh Boulter, Irish archbishop (b. 1672)
1783 – Étienne Bézout, French mathematician and theorist (b. 1730)
1832 – Karl Christian Friedrich Krause, German philosopher and author (b. 1781)
1833 – Raja Ram Mohan Roy, Indian humanitarian and reformer (b. 1772)
1838 – Bernard Courtois, French chemist and pharmacist (b. 1777)
1876 – Braxton Bragg, American general (b. 1817)
1886 – Charles Gordon Greene, American journalist and politician (b. 1804)
1891 – Ivan Goncharov, Russian author and critic (b. 1812)
1898 – Thomas Joseph Byrnes, Australian politician, 12th Premier of Queensland (b. 1860)

1901–present
1911 – Auguste Michel-Lévy, French geologist and academic (b. 1844)
1915 – Remy de Gourmont, French novelist, poet, and critic (b. 1858)
1917 – Edgar Degas, French painter and sculptor (b. 1834)
1919 – Adelina Patti, Italian-French opera singer (b. 1843) 
1921 – Engelbert Humperdinck, German composer and educator (b. 1854)
1934 – Ellen Willmott, English horticulturalist (b. 1858)
1935 – Alan Gray, English composer and organist (b. 1855)
1940 – Walter Benjamin, German philosopher and critic (b. 1892)
  1940   – Julius Wagner-Jauregg, Austrian physician and neuroscientist, Nobel Prize laureate (b. 1857)
1942 – Douglas Albert Munro, United States Coast Guard signalman, posthumously awarded Medal of Honor, (b. 1919)
1944 – Aimee Semple McPherson, Canadian-American evangelist, founded the International Church of the Foursquare Gospel (b. 1890)
1956 – Gerald Finzi, English composer and educator (b. 1901)
  1956   – Babe Didrikson Zaharias, American basketball player and golfer (b. 1911)
1960 – Sylvia Pankhurst, English activist (b. 1882)
1961 – Hilda Doolittle. American poet, novelist, and memoirist (b. 1886)
1965 – Clara Bow, American actress (b. 1905)
  1965   – William Stanier, English engineer, co-designed the London, Midland and Scottish Railway (b. 1876)
1967 – Felix Yusupov, Russian husband of Princess Irina Alexandrovna of Russia (b. 1887) 
1972 – S. R. Ranganathan, Indian mathematician, librarian, and academic (b. 1892)
1974 – Silvio Frondizi, Argentinian lawyer and academic (b. 1907)
1975 – Jack Lang, Australian lawyer and politician, 23rd Premier of New South Wales (b. 1876)
1979 – Gracie Fields, English actress and singer (b. 1898)
  1979   – Jimmy McCulloch, Scottish singer-songwriter and guitarist (b. 1953)
1981 – Robert Montgomery, American actor, singer, director, and producer (b. 1904)
1983 – Wilfred Burchett, Australian journalist and author (b. 1911)
1984 – Chronis Exarhakos, Greek actor (b. 1932)
1985 – Lloyd Nolan, American actor (b. 1902)
1986 – Cliff Burton, American bass player and songwriter  (b. 1962)
1991 – Joe Hulme, English footballer and cricketer (b. 1904)
1992 – Zhang Leping, Chinese comic artist (b. 1910)
1993 – Jimmy Doolittle, American general, Medal of Honor recipient (b. 1896)
  1993   – Fraser MacPherson, Canadian saxophonist and educator (b. 1928)
1996 – Mohammad Najibullah, Afghan physician and politician, seventh President of Afghanistan (b. 1947)
1997 – Walter Trampler, American viola player and educator (b. 1915)
1998 – Doak Walker, American football player (b. 1927)
2003 – Jean Lucas, French race car driver (b. 1927)
  2003   – Donald O'Connor, American actor, singer, and dancer (b. 1925)
2004 – John E. Mack, American psychiatrist and author (b. 1929)
2005 – Ronald Golias, Brazilian comedian and actor (b. 1929)
  2005   – Mary Lee Settle, American novelist, essayist, and memoirist (b. 1918)
2006 – Helmut Kallmeyer, German chemist and soldier (b. 1910)
2007 – Dale Houston, American singer-songwriter (b. 1940)
  2007   – Kenji Nagai, Japanese photographer and journalist (b. 1957)
2008 – Henri Pachard, American director and producer (b. 1939)
2009 – Ivan Dykhovichny, Russian director and screenwriter (b. 1947)
  2009   – Charles Houston, American physician and mountaineer (b. 1913)
  2009   – William Safire, American author and journalist (b. 1929)
2010 – George Blanda, American football player (b. 1927)
  2010   – Balaji Sadasivan, Singaporean neurosurgeon and politician, Minister of Foreign Affairs for Singapore (b. 1955)
  2010   – Trevor Taylor, English race car driver (b. 1936)
2011 – David Croft, English director, producer, and screenwriter (b. 1922)
  2011   – Imre Makovecz, Hungarian architect (b. 1935)
  2011   – Johnny "Country" Mathis, American singer-songwriter  (b. 1933)
2012 – Eddie Bert, American trombonist (b. 1922)
  2012   – Herbert Lom, Czech-English actor (b. 1917)
  2012   – John Silber, American academic and politician (b. 1926)
  2012   – Sanjay Surkar, Indian director and screenwriter (b. 1959)
  2012   – Frank Wilson, American songwriter and producer (b. 1940)
2013 – Oscar Castro-Neves, Brazilian-American guitarist, composer, and conductor (b. 1940)
  2013   – Tuncel Kurtiz, Turkish actor, director, and screenwriter (b. 1936)
  2013   – Albert Naughton, English rugby player (b. 1929)
2014 – Gaby Aghion, French fashion designer, founded Chloé (b. 1921)
  2014   – Eugie Foster, American journalist and author (b. 1971)
  2014   – Taylor Hardwick, American architect and educator, designed Haydon Burns Library and Friendship Fountain Park (b. 1925)
  2014   – Wally Hergesheimer, Canadian ice hockey player (b. 1927)
  2014   – Abdelmajid Lakhal, Tunisian actor and director (b. 1939)
  2014   – James Traficant, American lawyer and politician (b. 1941)
2015 – Syed Ahmed, Indian author and politician, 16th Governor of Manipur (b. 1945)
  2015   – Pietro Ingrao, Italian journalist and politician (b. 1915)
  2015   – Kallen Pokkudan, Indian activist and author (b. 1937)
  2015   – Frank Tyson, English-Australian cricketer, coach, and journalist (b. 1930)
2016 – David Hahn, American Boy Scout famous for attempting to build a nuclear reactor in a shed in his backyard (b. 1976)
2017 – Hugh Hefner, American publisher, founder of Playboy Enterprises (b. 1926)
2018 – Kavita Mahajan, Indian author and translator (b.1967)
  2018   – Michael Payton, American football quarterback  (b.1970)
  2018   – Manoharsinhji Pradyumansinhji, Indian nobleman and politician (b.1935)
  2018   – Marty Balin, American singer, co-founder of the band Jefferson Airplane (b. 1942)

Holidays and observances
 Christian feast days: 
 Adheritus
 Bonfilius
 Caius of Milan
 Vincent de Paul
 Cosmas and Damian
 September 27 (Eastern Orthodox liturgics)
 Consumación de la Independencia (Mexico)
 French Community Holiday (French community of Belgium)
 Independence Day (Turkmenistan), celebrates the independence of Turkmenistan from USSR in 1991.
 Meskel (Ethiopian and Eritrean Orthodox Church, following Julian calendar, September 28 on leap years)
 National Gay Men's HIV/AIDS Awareness Day (United States)
 Polish Underground State's Day (Poland)
 World Tourism Day (International)

References

External links

 
 
 

Days of the year
September